"Saft" ("Juice") is a song by the German hip hop group Die Fantastischen Vier. It was released in 1992 from the album 4 gewinnt. It tells about the "exchange of bodily fluids", dos and don'ts, pros and cons. The song reached number 38 on the Swiss record charts and number 19 in Germany.

References

External links
  (vinyl)
  (CD)

1992 singles
Die Fantastischen Vier songs
1992 songs
Songs written by Thomas D
Columbia Records singles
German-language songs